José Santos Damasceno Filho (born July 13, 1970 in Salvador, Bahia, Brazil), also known as Tiba, is a Mexican-Brazilian footballer.

Career
Born in Salvador, Bahia, Damasceno was signed by Mexican club Pumas UNAM on the recommendation of former Pumas player and native of Salvador, Evanivaldo Castro, during the 1991–92 season. Pumas loaned Damasceno to Celaya F.C. for the 1995–96 season. The following season he was sold to Atlante F.C., where he would have a strong reaction during the first round of the 1996–97 Mexican Primera División season Invierno playoffs against Toros Neza, whose players dyed their hair red and yellow.

References

External links
 Profile

1970 births
Living people
Brazilian footballers
Naturalized citizens of Mexico
Brazilian emigrants to Mexico
Sportspeople from Salvador, Bahia
Atlante F.C. footballers
Santos Laguna footballers
Chiapas F.C. footballers
Association football midfielders